Albatros was the name of at least three ships of the Italian Navy and may refer to:

 , a  launched in 1907 and discarded in 1923.
 , a submarine chaser launched in 1934 and sunk in 1941.

Italian Navy ship names